The 1988 Spanish motorcycle Grand Prix was the third round of the 1988 Grand Prix motorcycle racing season. It took place on the weekend of 22–24 April 1988 at the Circuito Permanente Del Jarama.

This was the first and only victory of the Australian Kevin Magee.

500 cc race report
Kevin Magee was on pole. Eddie Lawson got the lead at the first turn from Raymond Roche, Pierfrancesco Chili, et al. At the end of the first lap, Lawson had a gap from Christian Sarron, Wayne Gardner and Magee. Magee moved into 2nd and started to close the gap to Lawson; he managed to pass and took the win by a few lengths.

After 21 years, this would be the last Spanish motorcycle Grand Prix on the Jarama circuit. The event would move back to Jerez, where it has stayed permanently ever since.

500 cc classification

References

Spanish motorcycle Grand Prix
Spanish
Motorcycle
Spanish motorcycle Grand Prix